The Coupe de France 2004–05 was its 88th edition. It was won by AJ Auxerre.

The cup winner qualified for UEFA Cup.

Round of 16

Quarter-finals

Semi-finals

Final

Topscorer
Javier Saviola (6 goals)

References

French federation

2004–05 domestic association football cups
2004–05 in French football
2004-05